Liane Balaban (born June 24, 1980) is a Canadian actress. Her film debut was in New Waterford Girl (1999) as Agnes-Marie "Mooney" Pottie. She has since appeared in the films Definitely, Maybe (2008), Last Chance Harvey (2008), and the independent drama One Week (2008). She has guest-starred on the television series NCIS: Los Angeles, Covert Affairs and Alphas, and joined the cast of Supernatural for its eighth season.

Early life
Balaban was born in North York, Ontario, the daughter of a Catholic mother who worked as a medical secretary, and a Jewish father from the Uzbek SSR in the Soviet Union, who worked in real estate. She grew up in the Willowdale neighbourhood of North York, now part of Toronto, and went to high school at Lawrence Park Collegiate Institute, where she was classmates with singer Henry Lau. She majored in journalism at Ryerson University but left to concentrate on acting. She received a Bachelor of Arts degree in political science from Concordia University.

Career
Balaban made her feature film debut in New Waterford Girl (1999), as a 15-year-old misfit longing to escape the Cape Breton coal-mining town of New Waterford. Set in the 1970s, the film was directed by Allan Moyle. Producer Julia Sereny, who knew Balaban through her aunt and uncle, asked her to audition for the film. Balaban had studied drama in high school, but did not intend to be an actor. After seven auditions, she landed the part that won a Special Jury Citation at the 1999 Toronto International Film Festival and a nomination for a Canadian Comedy Award.

She made a successful follow-up with Saint Jude (2000), directed by John L'Ecuyer. She starred in the TV movie After the Harvest (2001), opposite Sam Shepard, and appeared in Happy Here and Now (2002), opposite David Arquette and Ally Sheedy. She also starred in the horror film Spliced (2002), co-starring Ron Silver. She was a member of the garage/electro/pop band We are Molecules, where she sang and played keyboards and drums. She has also written for arts newspapers.

While previously unsure of acting as a career, Balaban committed to seriously pursuing acting around 2007. She appeared in her first mainstream Hollywood feature film, Definitely, Maybe in 2008, a romantic comedy starring Ryan Reynolds. She next appeared in Last Chance Harvey, a romance starring Dustin Hoffman and Emma Thompson, which had a wide release in January 2009, in the supporting role of Susan, the estranged and soon-to-be-married daughter of Hoffman's character. She told The Globe and Mail that her time in London making the film was like "going to the best acting school in the world".

Balaban starred in the independent drama One Week (2008) as Samantha Pierce, a woman whose fiancé (Joshua Jackson) is diagnosed with terminal cancer and takes a motorcycle trip across Canada. Directed by Michael McGowan, Balaban was nominated for the Genie Award for Best Performance by an Actress in a Supporting Role in 2010 for her performance. She starred in the black comedy You Might as Well Live (2009) as a psychotic girl who is obsessed with explosives.

Balaban's other films in 2009 included Not Since You, a drama about a group of college friends; and The Trotsky by Jacob Tierney. She also shot the CBC TV movie Abroad, based on the love life of Leah McLaren, a Toronto columnist for The Globe and Mail. Balaban was nominated for the Gemini Award for best lead actress in a dramatic program or miniseries for the role. She then starred in The New Tenants with Vincent D’Onofrio, a short film entered in the CFC Worldwide Short Film Festival, which also won the 2010 Academy Award for Best Live Action Short Film.

Balaban starred in the 2010 comedy/drama Coach, directed by Will Frears, as an emergency room doctor who falls for an inner city soccer coach (Hugh Dancy). She appeared in the "Communication Breakdown" episode of the TV series Covert Affairs as Natasha Petrova, a Russian computer hacker, the character Auggie (Chris Gorham)'s ex-girlfriend. She also voiced Lucrezia Borgia in the video game Assassin's Creed: Brotherhood. She played a journalist opposite Paul Ahmarani in The Future is Now!, a docudrama by Gary Burns.

Balaban made her stage debut in February 2011 starring as Claire in Divisadero: A Performance at the Theatre Passe Muraille in Toronto. Directed by Daniel Brooks, it was an adaptation of a  Governor General’s Award-winning novel by Michael Ondaatje, with music by Justin Rutledge. It was restaged in February 2012.

Balaban filmed the independent comedy, Finding Joy, in Fort Lauderdale, Florida in mid-2011. She signed on to a recurring role in the CW drama Supernatural in 2012, as Amelia, a young doctor with tragedy in her past. In August she was in Newfoundland filming The Grand Seduction, an English-language version of the 2003 Québécois comedy Seducing Doctor Lewis (French: La grande séduction), in which she plays the love interest, opposite Taylor Kitsch, directed by Don McKellar. She will also appear in the independent film The People Garden, starring Pamela Anderson and written and directed by Nadia Litz.

Personal life
In 2007, Balaban lived in Mile End, Montreal. She described Montreal as "not a city that revolves around acting, so you stay very grounded here" to Hour magazine. She enjoys reading, writing, going to art galleries, and hearing music. She told Toronto's Now magazine in January 2009 that she was often mistaken for actress Natalie Portman. She moved to Los Angeles in 2010. , she resides in both Los Angeles and Toronto. She married in November 2013 and gave birth to a son on March 1, 2016.

Filmography

References

External links

We Are Molecules on Myspace

1980 births
Actresses from Toronto
Canadian film actresses
Canadian television actresses
Canadian people of Uzbekistani-Jewish descent
Concordia University alumni
Living people
People from North York
Toronto Metropolitan University alumni
Jewish Canadian actresses